VentureBeat is an American technology website headquartered in San Francisco, California. VentureBeat is a tech news source that publishes news, analysis, long-form features, interviews, and videos. The VentureBeat company was founded in 2006 by Matt Marshall, an ex-correspondent for The Mercury News.

History
In March 2009, VentureBeat signed a partnership agreement with IDG to produce DEMO Conference, a conference for startups to announce their launches and raise funding from venture capitalists and angel investors. The partnership with IDG ended in 2012.

In September 2009, Matt Marshall took on the role of executive producer for the DEMO conference. Over the years, a variety of companies have launched at DEMO including Boingo, TiVo, ETrade, VMware, Palm, Java, Symantec, Salesforce, and others. In September 2012, VentureBeat ended its partnership with DEMO.

In 2014 and 2015, the company raised outside investor funding from Silicon Valley venture capitalist firms including Crosslink Capital, Walden Venture Capital, Rally Ventures, Formation 8, and Lightbank.

VentureBeat produces a variety of themed industry events, including MobileBeat, GamesBeat, and GrowthBeat.  In addition, it produces several small, annual conclaves of C-level industry executives called Summits.

Editorial
The VentureBeat website comprises a series of distinct news "Beats": Big data, Business (general news), Cloud, Deals, Dev, Enterprise, Entrepreneur, Media, Mobile, Marketing, Security, Small Biz, and Social. In addition, the site includes a semi-separate publication, GamesBeat, as one of its major sections. GamesBeat focuses on video games and the videogame industry.

VentureBeats editorial team includes: 
 Harrison Weber – executive editor, and has previously written for The Next Web and The Huffington Post.
 Dean Takahashi – covers gaming and previously worked for The Wall Street Journal and Los Angeles Times.
 Dylan Tweney – former VentureBeat executive editor and current editor at large.
 Morwenna Marshall – current editor at large.

References

External links
 

American technology news websites
Internet properties established in 2009
Online mass media companies of the United States
Web-related conferences